Sukhteh Kuh (also Romanized as Sūkhteh Kūh; also known as Sūkhtkūh) is a village in Ahandan Rural District, in the Central District of Lahijan County, Gilan Province, Iran. At the 2006 census, its population was 340, in 92 families.

References 

Populated places in Lahijan County